Binibining Pilipinas 1992 was the 29th edition of Binibining Pilipinas. It took place at the Araneta Coliseum in Quezon City, Metro Manila, Philippines on February 22, 1992.

At the end of the event, Maria Lourdes Gonzalez crowned Elizabeth Berroya as Binibining Pilipinas Universe 1992, Patricia Betita crowned Jo-Anne Alivio as Binibining Pilipinas International 1992, while Selina Manalad crowned Marina Pura Benipayo as Binibining Pilipinas Maja 1992.

Starting this edition, the winners of the Binibining Pilipinas pageant will represent the Philippines in Miss Universe, Miss World, and Miss International after acquiring the franchise of Miss World. Gloria Diaz, Miss Universe 1969, crowned Marilen Espino as the first Binibining Pilipinas World.

A few days before her departure to South Africa, Marilen Espino contracted an illness which barred her from competing at Miss World 1992. Due to this, Marina Pura Benipayo was sent to compete at Miss World, replacing Espino. Espino replaced Benipayo at Miss Maja International, although the pageant was not held this year. However, both Espino and Benipayo retained their titles as Binibining Pilipinas World 1992 and Binibining Pilipinas Maja 1992, respectively.

Results 

 Color keys

  The contestant did not place.
  The contestant was not able to compete in an International pageant.

Special Awards

Contestants 
37 contestants competed for the four titles.

Notes

Post-pageant Notes 

 Elizabeth Berroya competed at Miss Universe 1992 in Bangkok, Thailand and was unplaced. Jo-Anne Alivio was also unplaced when she competed at Miss International 1992 in Sasebo, Japan.
 Marilen Espino contracted an illness preventing her to compete at Miss World 1992 in Sun City, South Africa, and was replaced by Marina Benipayo, which did not place in the competition. Espino supposedly represented the Philippines at the Miss Maja International pageant, but since the pageant was not held in 1992, Espino did not compete at any international competition. Both of them still retained their titles as Binibining Pilipinas World and Binibining Pilipinas Maja respectively.

References 

1992
1992 beauty pageants